Železiarne Podbrezová a.s. (ŽP) is a Slovak company headquartered in Podbrezová. ŽP specializes in steel tubes and automotive parts. Company has 3,173 employees (2015).

References

Manufacturing companies of Slovakia
Companies established in 1840
Slovak brands
Companies of Czechoslovakia